Heritiera is a genus of flowering plants in the family Malvaceae, subfamily Sterculioideae. They are most dominant tropical forest trees in several areas in eastern Africa and India to the Pacific. Some are mangroves. Several are valuable for their timber and are over-exploited.

Species 
The Catalogue of Life lists: 
 Heritiera actinophylla
 Heritiera albiflora
 Heritiera angustata
 Heritiera arafurensis
 Heritiera aurea
 Heritiera borneensis
 Heritiera burmensis
 Heritiera catappa
 Heritiera cordata
 Heritiera densiflora
 Heritiera dubia
 Heritiera elata
 Heritiera fomes
 Heritiera gigantea
 Heritiera globosa
 Heritiera impressinervia
 Heritiera javanica
 Heritiera kanikensis
 Heritiera kuenstleri
 Heritiera littoralis
 Heritiera longipetiolata
 Heritiera macrophylla
 Heritiera macroptera
 Heritiera magnifica
 Heritiera montana
 Heritiera novoguineensis
 Heritiera ornithocephala
 Heritiera papilio
 Heritiera parvifolia
 Heritiera peralata
 Heritiera percoriacea
 Heritiera polyandra
 Heritiera pterospermoides
 Heritiera rumphii
 Heritiera simplicifolia
 Heritiera solomonensis
 Heritiera sumatrana
 Heritiera sylvatica
 Heritiera trifoliolata
 Heritiera utilis

Gallery

References

External links 

 
Malvaceae genera
Taxonomy articles created by Polbot